Giovanni Atzeni (born 12 April 1985, Nagold, Germany), also known as Tittia, is an Italian Palio jockey.

Atzeni is famous for winning two consecutive races during Il Palio Di Siena in 2013, subsequently stopping his rival Luigi Bruschelli from matching the 200-year old record of 14 Palio wins.

Palio Victories

 2 July 2007 - winning for Nobile Contrada dell'Oca
 2 July 2011 - winning for Nobile Contrada dell'Oca
 2 July 2013 - winning for Nobile Contrada dell'Oca
 16 August 2013 - winning for Contrada Capitana dell'Onda
 17 August 2015 - winning for Contrada della Selva
 2 July 2019 - winning for Imperiale Contrada della Giraffa
 16 August 2019 - winning for Contrada della Selva
 2 July 2022 - winning for Contrada del Drago
 17 August 2022 - winning for Contrada del Leocorno

References: 
 The Palio  - records of Palio wins and jockey information. 
 Tittia's July 2013 Palio win

Italian jockeys
Living people
People from Calw (district)
Sportspeople from Karlsruhe (region)
1985 births